The Philippine Sports Training Center (PSTC) is a sports complex proposed to be built in Bagac, Bataan, Philippines. It will be owned by the Philippine Sports Commission and will be the official training facility for members of the Philippine national teams and national training pool.

Background

Legislation
The construction of the Philippine Sports Training Center was proposed through legislation. Senate Bill No. 1716, or the Philippine Amateur Sports Training Center Act was authored a sponsored by Senator and professional boxer Manny Pacquiao with the bill also co-sponsored by Senator Sonny Angara. On November 28, 2018, the Bicameral Conference Committee approved the bill after consolidating it with its version filed in the House of Representatives. A law leading to the construction of the facility, Republic Act No. 11214 also known as Philippine Sports Training Center Act, was signed into law by President Rodrigo Duterte on February 14, 2019.

Construction
The Philippine Sports Commission announced on December 4, 2018, that the Philippine Sports Training Center will be primarily built in Rosales, Pangasinan. It was also announced while Rosales will serve as the main hub of the center, some of the facilities will be hosted in the bordering province of Tarlac. However by 2021, the proposed location for the sports complex has been changed, with the facility to be built in the town of Bagac in Bataan province instead. The provincial province of Bataan donated a  property in the town for the construction of the PSTC.

Under the provisions of the deed of donation, signed during a ceremony in Mariveles, is that the infrastructure of the PTSC should be completed by December 31, 2025.  will be appropriated and included in the General Appropriations Act (GAA) for the construction of the PSTC. Any other funds will be drawn from the budget allocated to specifically the Philippine Sports Commission in the GAA.

President Rodrigo Duterte led the groundbreaking ceremony for the sports complex on June 17, 2022

Facilities
The training center are planned to host the following facilities:

Sports training venues
Baseball field
Beach volleyball courts
Bowling center
Covered swimming and diving pool
Football field
Gymnastics center
Multi-purpose gymnasium
Multi-purpose field
Archery range
BMX track
Lawn balls and petanque field
Rugby pitch
Skeet and trap range
Softball field
Track and field oval
Lawn tennis courts
Velodrome

Other facilities
Administration building
Athletes' and coaches' dormitory
Conference and seminar hall
Guests' villas
Sports science building
Mess hall
Recreation hall
Library
Weight training building
School buildings
Medical center
Worship and meditation room

See also
New Clark City Sports Hub
PFF National Training Centre
Philippine Sports Institute

References

Sports complexes in the Philippines
Proposed buildings and structures in the Philippines